Swan Lane Mills is a former cotton mill complex in Bolton, Greater Manchester. All three mills are Grade II* listed buildings.
The mills were designed by Stott and Sons of Oldham. When completed, the double mill (Nos. 1 and 2) was the largest spinning mill in the world. It was granted Grade II* listed status on 26 April 1974. Number 3 Mill was separately listed as Grade II* on the same day.

History
Swan Lane Mills are typical of the final phase of cotton mill construction in Lancashire, of vast size and decorated with flamboyant terracotta embellishments reflecting the industry's prominence and prosperity. The mill was planned as a double mill with a central boiler house and built in two phases. Swan Lane Number 1 Mill was built in 1902, and Number 2 Mill three years later. The double mill was built to contain 210,000 mule spindles. Number 3 Mill was built in 1915 and housed 120,000 mule spindles. Number 1 Mill spun fine counts using Sea Island Cotton and Number 2 Mill concentrated on medium counts using Egyptian cotton.The mill also had 250 carding and 200 drawing and roving frames.

Architecture
The mills are constructed in brick with yellow brick decoration. Both mills are of five storeys over a basement and were built in the same style with wide segmentally arched windows and flat concrete roofs. They have a yellow brick eaves band and a stone dentilled cornice. Their projecting stair towers have Italianate details and balustraded parapets. The double engine house on the north-west side was built to power both mills. The rope race tower projects behind it. The mill chimney has been reduced in height but retains an emblem of a swan in white lettering. Its internal construction is of cast iron columns and brick arched ceilings. No.1 Mill is 25 bays wide and five deep with a single storey and basement extension to its north side, possibly a card room, but now used as a warehouse. No.2 Mill is 23 bays long and six deep. The mill's two-storey office block is attached next to the site entrance.

No. 3 Mill of 1915 is brick built with stone dressings, rounded corners and a ridged slate roof. It is 23 bays long, 14 wide with segmentally headed windows and eight storeys high (six plus a double attic). It is possibly the tallest of the mule-spinning mills most of which were up to six storeys in height. Above the sixth storey is a cornice from where carved swans project at intervals and the arcaded attic has round windows to its upper storey. The south-west corner entrance has a panel with a carved swan above the doorway and accesses a staircase. The tower above it is corbelled above the fifth floor and has angle pinnacles. A two-storey extension houses the card room and warehouse. Its engine house, two bays wide and three deep, has round arched windows.

Power
George Saxon & Co supplied No. 1 Mill with a cross compound engine (works number 352) in 1903. It developed 1300hp, had 26 and 52 inch cylinders with a 5-foot stroke and its 26-foot flywheel powered the machinery via 35 ropes. In 1906 an identical engine was installed for No. 2 Mill. No. 3 Mill was powered by a 2000 hp vertical triple expansion engine also supplied by Saxons. It had a 25 feet diameter flywheel weighing 25 tons, Corliss valves and 44 ropes. Steam was generated by ten Lancashire boilers. The engines powered the entire mill complex until 1959 when motor-driven ring frames were installed but one engine continued to provide power for some processes in Nos. 1 and 2 Mills.

Popular culture
In 1983 Swan Lane Mills was featured in an episode of the documentary Fred, in which Fred Dibnah is hired to remove the decorative ornamental on top of the chimney by then the last decorative topped chimney in Bolton. He was paid £4000 (1982) for the work.

See also

 Grade II* listed buildings in Greater Manchester
 Listed buildings in Bolton
 List of mills in Bolton

References
Notes

Bibliography

External links
 Aerial view of Swan Lane Mills in 1949

Cotton mills
Textile mills in the Metropolitan Borough of Bolton
Grade II* listed buildings in Greater Manchester
Grade II* listed industrial buildings